Tibbits House, also known as Tibbits Hall, is a historic home located at Hoosick in Rensselaer County, New York.  The house was built about 1860 and -story, rectangular Gothic Revival–style building.  It is constructed of cut ashlar sandstone blocks and has steeply pitched gable roofs covered with fishscale slate.  It features projecting porches, bay windows, changes of rooflines, dormers, chimneys, and two towers.  The existing house on the property was originally owned by U.S. Congressman George Tibbits (1763–1849); his son George Mortimer Tibbits (1796–1878) built the Tibbits House. At the time the property was bought by the Tibbits it was the location of a wooden house built before the Revolution by a Loyalist named Pfister. The Tibbits estate was a stop on the Underground Railroad.  The building was acquired by Hoosac School in 1952 and is used as a dormitory, classrooms, and for administrative offices.

It was listed on the National Register of Historic Places in 1978.

References

External links
Hoosac School website

Houses on the National Register of Historic Places in New York (state)
Gothic Revival architecture in New York (state)
Houses completed in 1860
Houses in Rensselaer County, New York
Houses on the Underground Railroad
National Register of Historic Places in Rensselaer County, New York